was a Japanese film studio active in the 1930s.

Background
Shinkō was established in September 1931 out of the remnants of the Teikoku Kinema studio with the help of Shōchiku capital. The historian Jun'ichirō Tanaka writes that the studio was part of Shōchiku's effort to monopolize the Japanese film industry, using Shinkō to control some of the independent production companies by distributing their films, and absorb rebellious talent who left rivals like Nikkatsu or Fuji Eiga. And in fact, Shinkō did distribute the films of jidaigeki stars like Tsumasaburō Bandō and Kanjūrō Arashi or gendaigeki stars such as Takako Irie. For a time, such directors as Kenji Mizoguchi, Tomu Uchida, Minoru Murata, Shigeyoshi Suzuki, and Yutaka Abe, as well as such stars as Tokihiko Okada, Isamu Kosugi, Eiji Nakano, Fumiko Yamaji and Mitsuko Mori made movies there. Masaichi Nagata became studio head at one point. Its main offices were located in Hatchōbori in Tokyo, and its studios in Uzumasa in Kyoto and Ōizumi (now in Nerima) in Tokyo.

Merger 
Shinkō, however, could not retain such talent and remained a second-rank studio. In the 1941 government-led reorganization of the industry, it was merged with Daito Eiga and the production arm of Nikkatsu to form Daiei Studios. The Tokyo and Kyoto studios of the Toei Company are currently located on the sites of the old Shinkō studios.

See also 
Cinema of Japan

References

Japanese film studios